Tennessee's 15th Senate district is one of 33 districts in the Tennessee Senate. It has been represented by Republican Paul Bailey since 2014, succeeding retiring Democrat Charlotte Burks.

Geography
District 15 covers much of rural Middle Tennessee, including all of Bledsoe, Cumberland, Jackson, Overton, Putnam, and White Counties. Communities in the district include Cookeville, Crossville, Sparta, Fairfield Glade, Livingston, Lake Tansi Village, Algood, Monterey, Pikeville, and Gainesboro.

The district is mostly located in Tennessee's 6th congressional district, also extending into the 4th district. It overlaps with the 25th, 31st, 41st, 42nd, and 43rd districts of the Tennessee House of Representatives.

Recent election results
Tennessee Senators are elected to staggered four-year terms, with odd-numbered districts holding elections in midterm years and even-numbered districts holding elections in presidential years.

2018

2014

Federal and statewide results in District 15

1998 election
In 1998, the district was the site of a highly unusual election. Incumbent Democrat Tommy Burks was expected to coast to re-election over Republican Byron (Low Tax) Looper until, in October 1998, Looper shot and killed Burks on his own farm. Tennessee state law mandated that deceased candidates be removed from the ballot, but candidates who had been charged with a felony but not convicted were allowed to remain, meaning that Looper's name was the only one on the ballot a month later. However, friends of Burks as well as local politicians launched a write-in campaign for Charlotte Burks, Tommy Burks' widow. Although Burks herself never campaigned for the seat, the write-in effort was overwhelmingly successful, ultimately defeating Looper 95-5%. She went on to serve for 4 terms, while Looper was sentenced to life in prison.

References 

15
Bledsoe County, Tennessee
Cumberland County, Tennessee
Jackson County, Tennessee
Overton County, Tennessee
Putnam County, Tennessee
White County, Tennessee